Guillaume Jeannet (born 17 October 1977) is a French rower. He competed in the men's quadruple sculls event at the 2000 Summer Olympics.

References

1977 births
Living people
French male rowers
Olympic rowers of France
Rowers at the 2000 Summer Olympics
Sportspeople from Mâcon